Vijayawada West (Assembly constituency) or (Bhavani Puram) is a constituency in NTR district of Andhra Pradesh, representing the state legislative assembly in India. As per the Delimitation Orders (1967), the constituency was formed. It is one of the seven assembly segments of Vijayawada Lok Sabha constituency, along with Tiruvuru (SC), Vijayawada Central, Vijayawada East, Mylavaram, Nandigama, and Jaggayyapeta. Velam Palli Srinivasa Rao is the present MLA of the constituency, who won the 2019 Andhra Pradesh Legislative Assembly election from YSR Congress Party. , there are a total of 232,555 electors in the constituency.

Mandals 

The mandal and wards that form the assembly constituency are:

Members of Legislative Assembly 

Vellampalli Srinivas is the present MLA of the constituency from YSRCP. He defeated Shabana Katun of TDP.

Assembly elections 2009

Assembly elections 2014

Assembly elections 2019

See also 
 List of constituencies of the Andhra Pradesh Legislative Assembly
 Vijayawada East (Assembly constituency)
 Vijayawada Central (Assembly constituency)

References 

Assembly constituencies of Andhra Pradesh